Nigel Donn (born 2 March 1962) is an English former professional footballer. His clubs included Leyton Orient and Gillingham.

After his League career he played non-league football for a further 14 seasons with  Maidstone United, Dover Athletic and Ashford Town where he was a player/manager. 

He currently resides in Bearsted, Kent and owns a picture framing shop named Kentish Frames.

References

1962 births
Living people
Sportspeople from Maidstone
English footballers
Association football midfielders
Gillingham F.C. players
Leyton Orient F.C. players
Dover Athletic F.C. players
Maidstone United F.C. (1897) players
Ashford United F.C. players
English Football League players
English football managers
Dover Athletic F.C. managers
Ashford United F.C. managers
People from Bearsted